Westringia viminalis  is a flowering plant in the mint family. The specific epithet refers to its long, slender shoots. It is closely related to Westringia fruticosa, which is found on coastal heath and cliffs in New South Wales.

Description
It is a compact or scrambling shrub, growing to 1 m in height. The leaves are crowded, in whorls of three or four, narrowly elliptic, 10–20 mm long and 1–3 mm wide, with recurved edges. The flowers are white, often with pink spots in the throat of the corolla. The seeds are 1.5–2 mm long. The flowering season is from April to December.

Distribution and habitat
The plant is endemic to Australia’s subtropical Lord Howe Island in the Tasman Sea. It occurs on ledges and cliffs, at an elevation of 350–450 m, on Mounts Lidgbird and Gower at the southern end of the island, with a few plants found on exposed sites in the northern hills.

References

viminalis
Endemic flora of Lord Howe Island
Lamiales of Australia
Plants described in 1993
Taxa named by Barry John Conn